The Americas Federation of Netball Associations (AFNA), is the governing body for the organized sport of netball in the Americas. For netball's organizational purposes, the Americas Region, as agreed upon by World Netball (WN, known previously as the International Netball Federation or INF), covers a total of fifty-four countries. 
The Americas Region currently has 1 Associate Member and 15 Full Regional & World Netball Members. The current president of the AFNA is Marva Bernard.

World Netball was previously known as the International Netball Federation and the International Federation of Netball Associations and is the worldwide governing body for Netball.

Full members
As of December 2021, the AFNA has fifteen full members:
 Antigua & Barbuda
 Argentina
 Barbados
 Bermuda
 Canada
 Cayman Islands
 Dominica
 Grenada
 Jamaica
 St. Kitts & Nevis
 St. Lucia
 St. Maartens
 Saint Vincent & the Grenadines
 Trinidad & Tobago
 USA

Associate members
As of 21 October 2014, the AFNA has three associate members:
 Anguilla
 Dominica
 Guyana

See also
 Netball in the Americas

References

    
Pan-American sports governing bodies